Viola Kleiser (born  in Vienna) is an Austrian bobsledder and sprinter.

Before bobsleigh, Kleiser was a student-athlete at the University of Missouri–Kansas City where she majored in Psychology. Under the direction of head track coach Shameika McField, she ran short sprints and relays for the team.

Career

Best Times

Indoor-
60 meters: 7.59 at NÖLV county championships, 7 January 2015
200 meters: 25.17 at The Summit League Championships, 15 February 2012 (UMKC School Record)

Outdoor-
100 meters: 11.68 Meeting at Kapfenberg, 20 July 2014
200 meters: 24.07 at Austrian championships  3 August 2014
400 meters: 56.62 at MU Relays, 24 March 2012 

Kleiser competed at the 2014 Winter Olympics for Austria. She teamed with driver Christina Hengster in the two-woman event, finishing 15th. She participated in the first two runs, before being replaced by Alexandra Tüchi.

Kleiser made her World Cup debut in November 2013. As of April 2014, her best World Cup finish is 12th, at Calgary in 2013–14.

Kleiser is currently competing in the 2015 European Games, the first of its kind, for her home country of Austria, in team athletics, and earned a silver medal.

Personal life
She was born to Sigrid Eysn and Christoph Kleiser on 13 November 1990. Viola has two sisters, Valerie Kleiser and Flora Kleiser.

References

1990 births
Living people
Austrian female sprinters
Austrian female bobsledders
Olympic bobsledders of Austria
Athletes from Vienna
Bobsledders at the 2014 Winter Olympics
European Games gold medalists for Austria
Athletes (track and field) at the 2015 European Games
European Games medalists in athletics
21st-century Austrian women